"Take Me Home Tonight" is a song by American rock singer Eddie Money. It was released in August 1986 as the lead single from his album Can't Hold Back. The song's chorus interpolates the Ronettes' 1963 hit "Be My Baby", with original vocalist Ronnie Spector providing uncredited vocals and reprising her role. Songwriting credit was given to Mike Leeson, Peter Vale, Ellie Greenwich, Phil Spector and Jeff Barry.

The song reached number four on the Billboard Hot 100 on November 15, 1986, and number one on the Album Rock Tracks chart; outside the U.S., it was a top 15 hit in Canada. It received a Grammy nomination for Best Male Rock Vocal Performance,  and was Money's biggest hit on the U.S. charts.

Alongside its album, "Take Me Home Tonight" helped revive Money's career after a period of declining sales. It also allowed Spector to resume her touring/recording career after several years of retirement.

Background
By the mid-1980s, Eddie Money had reached a low point in his recording career after several years of drug abuse. Columbia Records still wanted to keep Money on its roster, but restricted his creative control over his work. Record producer Richie Zito brought Money the song "Take Me Home Tonight". Money would later say, "I didn't care for the demo [but] it did have a good catch line. When I heard [a snippet of] 'Be My Baby' in it I said: 'Why can't we get Ronnie Spector to sing it?'" The reply was, "That's impossible." Money invited his friend Martha Davis, lead vocalist of The Motels, to rerecord the lines from "Be My Baby" for "Take Me Home Tonight". However, Davis encouraged him to try to recruit Spector herself. Money was eventually able to reach Spector by phone at her home in northern California. Recalled Money, "I could hear clinking and clanking in the background... She said: 'I'm doing the dishes, and I gotta change the kids' bedding. I'm not really in the business anymore, Eddie. Phil Spector and all that, it was a nightmare'... I said 'Ronnie, I got this song that's truly amazing and it's a tribute to you. It would be so great if you... did it with me.'" 

Money would say, "I didn't like the song, but... it helped Ronnie out and it helped me get some of my other material on the album across, so now I'm happy I did it." The song's success encouraged Spector to resume her singing career, and she released her second solo album, Unfinished Business, in 1987.

Music video
The video was directed by Nick Morris and shot entirely in black and white at the Lawlor Events Center in Reno, Nevada. It opens with Money alone with a metal ladder and a folding chair on an otherwise empty stage. He sings and plays an alto saxophone to an absent audience, while Ronnie Spector is seen in a make-up room and then walking through a backstage hallway to the arena floor during cutaways. Spector's face is not completely revealed until about three-quarters of the way through the video.

Reception
The Los Angeles Times Steve Hochman, in a review of Can't Hold Back, felt that Money did Spector a disservice, particularly with the song's "characterless production," commenting, "where Phil Spector built his wall with style and grace, Money has erected a monolithic barrier."

Accolades
The song was nominated for Best Male Rock Vocal Performance at the 29th Annual Grammy Awards on February 24, 1987, but lost to Robert Palmer's "Addicted to Love".

In popular culture
The song served as the basis for the title of the 2011 film of the same name. The song itself played in the theatrical trailer and on the menu screen of the Blu-Ray and DVD releases. Despite this, it never actually appears in the film.

The song was sampled and interpolated by New Zealand rapper PNC in "Take Me Home" featuring Mz J from the album Bazooka Kid.

Commercial performance

In Canada, it debuted on RPM Top Singles chart at number 95 in the issue dated October 4, 1986, and peaked at number 15 during the week of November 29, 1986.

Charts

Weekly charts

Year-end charts

References

External links

1986 singles
Eddie Money songs
Black-and-white music videos
Songs written by Phil Spector
Songs written by Ellie Greenwich
Columbia Records singles
Songs written by Peter Vale
Songs written by Mick Leeson
Songs written by Jeff Barry
1986 songs
Song recordings produced by Richie Zito
Male–female vocal duets